Lab en Kisses is a 1996 Philippine romantic comedy film written and directed by Tony Y. Reyes. The film stars Vic Sotto and Vina Morales in their respective title roles. It is a pun on the word Love and Kisses.

Cast
 Vic Sotto as Lab
 Vina Morales as Kisses
 Larry Silva as Popoy
 Yoyong Martirez as Dodong
 Rez Cortez as Mickey
 Jaime Fabregas as Uncle John
 Don Pepot as Amboy
 Richard Merck as Badong
 Romy Diaz as Aga
 Beth Tamayo as Maria
 Janus del Prado as Kaloy
 Agatha Tapan as Kikay
 Alwyn Uytingco as Kokoy
 Vangie Labalan as Inday
 Maning Bato as Maning
 Danny Labra as Marlon

References

External links

1996 films
1996 romantic comedy films
Filipino-language films
Philippine comedy films
GMA Pictures films
OctoArts Films films
Films directed by Tony Y. Reyes
M-Zet Productions films